Ytter-Vikna (sometimes Ytre Vikna) is one of the three major islands in the municipality of Nærøysund in Trøndelag county, Norway. It is located in the western part of Vikna. Norwegian County Road 770 crosses the  island. The villages of Austafjord and Valøya are located on this island.

See also
List of islands of Norway

References

Islands of Trøndelag
Nærøysund
Vikna